Carvin is a commune in the Pas-de-Calais department in the Hauts-de-France region of France.

Geography

History
Major excavations have recently revealed occupation going back to Neolithic times. This settlement is linked to the existence of the vast wet depression around the now-disappeared castle of Epinoy. In the early 12th century, the hamlet of Épinoy, now the east part of the commune, was the home of the hermit Saint Druon of Sebourg.

The history of this market town, located on the road between Arras, Lille and Tournai, was then marked by coal mining, starting in the mid-nineteenth century and ending in 1975. One of the smaller mining companies had its headquarters in Carvin. At nationalization, the pits and mining facilities were consolidated within the Oignies group.

During World War I, from October 1914 to October 1918, Carvin was occupied by the Germans. Located at the rear of the front as a garrison town for both German military and civilians. The bodies of over 6,000 soldiers are laid to rest in one of the largest German cemeteries in the Nord-Pas-de-Calais region.

Carvin was awarded the Croix de Guerre on September 28, 1920.

In May 1940, during the German invasion of France, Carvin's town centre was the scene of a major battle that allowed the bulk of British and French troops to get to Dunkirk and freedom. Once the allies had gone, the troops of the Wehrmacht delivered fierce reprisals on the population of the towns of mining pit 4: Carvin, Courrières and Oignies. Following the miners' strike in May and June 1941 which spread throughout the Nord-Pas-de-Calais, many miners (mostly communists) were arrested and executed at Arras.

In 1947, Carvin lost nearly a third of its territory with the separation of the commune of Libercourt, which claimed its independence.
The town lost much of its industry during the years 1970 to 1990. Mining, construction and engineering were all reduced in size. Much of the railway network was dismantled in the early 1990s. Today it is mostly a services and residential commune for the regional capital, Lille.

Population

Places of interest
 The church of St.Martin, dating from the eighteenth century.
 Two nineteenth-century churches, of St. Druon and St.Barbe.
 The Commonwealth War Graves Commission cemetery.

Notable people
 Jacques Secrétin, international table tennis player, was born in Carvin in 1949.

International relations

Carvin is twinned with:
 Kłodzko, Poland
 Carvico, Italy

See also
Communes of the Pas-de-Calais department

References

External links

 Website of the Mairie de Carvin 
 Website of the Communauté d'agglomération d'Hénin-Carvin 
 website of the CWGC graves in the communal cemetery 

Communes of Pas-de-Calais
Artois